Wayta Urqu (Quechua wayta crest; wild flower; the whistling of the wind, urqu mountain, Hispanicized spelling Huayta Orjo) is a  mountain in the Wansu mountain range in the Andes of Peru, about  high. It is situated in the Arequipa Region, La Unión Province,  Puyca District. Wayta Urqu lies north of Chhijmuni.

References 

Mountains of Arequipa Region